Caroline Alexander is a British author, classicist and filmmaker. She is the author of the best-selling The Endurance, and The Bounty, and other works of literary non-fiction, such as The Way to Xanadu and The War that Killed Achilles. In 2015, she published a new translation of Homer's Iliad.

Alexander is also a writer and producer of documentaries such as The Endurance (based upon her book of the same title) and Tiger Tiger.

Personal life and education

Born March 13, 1956, in the United States of British parents, Alexander grew up in North Florida, but travelled widely, living in the West Indies, Italy, England, Ireland, and the Netherlands. She began her classical studies at Florida State University in her senior year of high-school. In 1977, among the first class of female Rhodes Scholars, she attended Somerville College, Oxford, taking her degree in Philosophy and Theology.

Between 1982 and 1985, she established a small department of classics at the University of Malawi, in south-central Africa. Following this, she obtained her doctorate in Classics at Columbia University, as a Mellon Fellow in the Humanities.

An avid athlete, Alexander was among the first women admitted to the US National Modern Pentathlon Training program, competing in three national championships for this sport, and was an alternate for the 1982 US World Team.

Career
Alexander began her career as a freelance writer while in graduate school, and subsequently has published widely on subjects ranging from Antarctic exploration, travels in central Africa, tigers, butterfly poachers, ancient history, lost treasure, Xanadu, and military subjects such as shell shock and blast-induced neurotrauma. She has published two New York Times best-sellers (The Endurance, The Bounty).

Alexander was a Contributing Writer for National Geographic Magazine for many years, and has also written for The New Yorker, Outside and Smithsonian among other publications; her work has appeared in a number of anthologies of literary non-fiction.

Her National Geographic Magazine cover story, “The Invisible War on The Brain,” was praised for exploring the effects of blast-induced trauma on modern soldiers, and nominated for a Kavli Science Journalism Award.

Alexander is a member of the American Philological Association, the Royal Geographical Society, the Explorer's Club, and the Directors Guild of America.

Articles 

 “Crossing the Wine-Dark Sea: In Search of the Places that inspired the Iliad.” (the refugees who carried the Iliad tradition out of Greece). The American Scholar, Summer 2019.
 “War of Words” (Britain's secret propaganda unit in WW1). Lapham’s Quarterly, Spring 2018.
 “The Dread Gorgon” (origin of the face of fear.) Lapham's Quarterly, Summer 2017.
 “Greece, Gods, and the Great Beyond,” (Ancient Greek quest for immortality). National Geographic Magazine. July 2016.
 “War Shock: Blast and the Brain” (blast-induced traumatic brain injury). National Geographic Magazine. February 2015.
 “500 pounds of Stealth” (seeking tigers in the Indian and Bangladesh Sunderbans). Outside. June 2014.
 “The Wine-Like Sea” (what did Homer mean?). Lapham's Quarterly. Summer 2013.
 “Cry of the Tiger” (the plight of our greatest cat). National Geographic Magazine. December, 2011. Nominated for Overseas Press Club Award.
 “Gold in the Ground” (discovery of an Anglo-Saxon treasure hoard). National Geographic Magazine. November, 2011.
 “Shock of War” (WW1 shell-shock and Traumatic Brain Injury). Smithsonian. September 2010.
 “The Great Game” (war and sport). Lapham's Quarterly.  Summer, 2010.
 “Captain Bligh's Cursed Breadfruit” (Jamaica's botanical legacy from the Bounty). Smithsonian. September 2009.
 “If the Stones Could Speak” (new theories about Stonehenge). National Geographic Magazine, June 2008.
 “Tigerland” (travels in the Indian Sundarbans). The New Yorker, April 21, 2008.
 “Making a New World’: Gertrude Bell and the Creation of Iraq” (nation-building in the 1920s). National Geographic Magazine (international editions), March, 2008.
 “The Face of War” (masks for soldiers mutilated in WW1). Smithsonian. February 2007.
 “Murdering the Impossible” (profile of mountaineer Reinhold Messner). National Geographic Magazine, November 2006. National Magazine Award Finalist.
 “Across the River Styx” (looking for MIA's in Vietnam). The New Yorker, October 25, 2004.
 “The Wreck of the Pandora” (wreck of the ship carrying the captured mutineers of the Bounty). The New Yorker, August 4, 2003.
 “Echoes of the Heroic Age”; “Ascent to Glory”; “Alexander the Conqueror” (three part series on the history of ancient Greece). National Geographic Magazine, December 1999 – March 2000.
 “Shackleton and the Legend of Endurance” (Sir Ernest Shackleton's 1914-16 Expedition). National Geographic Magazine, November 1998.
 “Crimes of Passion” (a butterfly poaching conspiracy). Outside, January 1996.
 “Plato Speaks” (the trial of Hastings Banda, dictator of Malawi and ardent classicist). Granta, September 1995.
 “A Shot in the Night” (death at a girl's camp in Tennessee) Outside, July 1994.
 “Little Men” (the mysterious shrunken men of Ecuador). Outside, April 1994.
 “An Ideal State” (Plato's Republic in Malawi). The New Yorker, December 16, 1991.
 “The White Goddess of the Wangora” (the earliest dramatic movie made in Africa). The New Yorker, April 8, 1991.
 “Vital Powers: a Profile of Daphne Park, O.B.E., C.M.G.” (a profile of one Britain's first female diplomats). The New Yorker, January 30, 1989.
 “The North Borneo Expedition of 1981” (insect collecting in Borneo). The New Yorker, September 14, 1987.

References

20th-century American women writers
20th-century American non-fiction writers
1956 births
Living people
Columbia Graduate School of Arts and Sciences alumni
Academic staff of the University of Malawi
21st-century American women writers
American women non-fiction writers
21st-century American non-fiction writers
Alumni of Somerville College, Oxford
Translators of Homer